Willis Perry Bocock (1806  – 1887) was a nineteenth-century American politician from Virginia.  He served as the Attorney General of Virginia, as a member of the Virginia General Assembly, and as a representative to the Virginia Constitutional Convention of 1850.

Early life
Bocock was born in Buckingham County, Virginia in 1806, before it split to form Appomattox County. He was educated at the University of Virginia, receiving a Bachelor of Laws degree in 1835.

Career

As an adult, Bocock established a law practice in Appomattox, and served several terms in the General Assembly.

Bocock served as the Virginia Attorney General from 1848 to 1857.

In 1850, Bocock was elected to the Virginia Constitutional Convention of 1850. He was one of three delegates elected from the Southside delegate district made up of his home district of Appomattox County, as well as Charlotte and Prince Edward Counties.

A dangerous fall made him a cripple, and he resigned his Attorney General's office, relocating to Macon, Hale County, Alabama where he "led the life of a private gentleman."

Death
Willis Perry Bocock died in Macon, Hale County, Alabama in 1887.

References

Bibliography

Members of the Virginia General Assembly
1806 births
1887 deaths
Virginia Attorneys General
People from Appomattox County, Virginia
People from Hale County, Alabama
19th-century American politicians